Celestus fowleri, also known commonly as the bromeliad galliwasp and Fowler's galliwasp,  is a species of lizard in the family Diploglossidae. The species is endemic to Jamaica.

Etymology
The specific name, fowleri, is in honor of American herpetologist Danny C. Fowler.

Geographic range
C. fowleri is found only in northwestern Jamaica, in Trelawny Parish.

Habitat

Behavior

Reproduction
C. fowleri is ovoviviparous.

References

Further reading
Schwartz A (1971). "A new species of bromeliad-inhabiting galliwasp (Sauria: Anguidae) from Jamaica". Breviora (371): 1–10. (Diploglossus fowleri, new species).
Schwartz A, Henderson RW (1991). Amphibians and Reptiles of the West Indies: Descriptions, Distributions, and Natural History. Gainesville, Florida: University of Florida Press. 714 pp. . (Celestus fowleri, new combination).
Schwartz A, Thomas R (1975). A Check-list of West Indian Amphibians and Reptiles. Carnegie Museum of Natural History Special Publication No. 1. Pittsburgh, Pennsylvania: Carnegie Museum of Natural History. 216 pp. (Diploglossus fowleri, p. 119).
Wilson BS (2011). "Conservation of Jamaican amphibians and reptiles". pp. 273–310. In: Hailey A, Wilson BS, Horrocks JA (editors) (2011). Conservation of Caribbean Island Herpetofaunas Volume 2: Regional Accounts of the West Indies. Leiden, The Netherlands: Brill. 440 pp. .

Celestus
Lizards of the Caribbean
Endemic fauna of Jamaica
Reptiles of Jamaica
Reptiles described in 1971
Taxa named by Albert Schwartz (zoologist)
Taxonomy articles created by Polbot